Joseph H. Johnson, Jr. (June 16, 1871 – March 7, 1942) was New York City Fire Commissioner from 1911 to 1913. He was chief of the New York City Transit Authority. By 1918 he was deputy New York City Comptroller. He served as chief of the New York Public Service Commission in 1921.

Biography
Johnson was born on June 16, 1871 in Griffin, Georgia to Joseph H. Johnson, Sr. (1840–1910) and Sarah E. Beeks (1844–1884). He first worked as a newspaper man.

He was appointed the 8th New York City Fire Commissioner by Mayor William Jay Gaynor on June 1, 1911, and served in that position until the end of the term of Mayor Ardolph L. Kline in 1913.

He was deputy New York City Comptroller and he took a leave of absence in 1918, when the United States entered World War I, to temporarily join the American Red Cross.

He later was Chief of the Transit Bureau of the Public Service Commission.

He was appointed as chief of the Commissioner of Public Works in 1921 replacing Clarence Fay.

He died at his Atlanta, Georgia home on March 7, 1942.

References

1871 births
1941 deaths
Executives of Metropolitan Transportation Authority (New York)
Commissioners of the New York City Fire Department
New York City Comptrollers
New York Public Service Commission